Cerebro (Spanish for "brain", from Latin ) is a fictional device appearing in American comic books published by Marvel Comics. The device is used by the X-Men (in particular, their leader, Professor Charles Xavier) to detect humans, specifically mutants. It was created by Professor X and Magneto, and was later enhanced by Dr. Hank McCoy.

Publication history
Cerebro first appeared in X-Men #7 (September 1964).

Concept and creation

Cerebro first appeared in X-Men #7 (1964). Professor Jeffrey J. Kripal, in his 2011 book Mutants and Mystics: Science Fiction, Superhero Comics, and the Paranormal, calls Cerebro "a piece of psychotronics" and describes it as "a spiderlike, Kirby-esque system of machines and wires that transmitted extrasensory data into Professor Xavier's private desk in another room". Kripal notes that Cerebro made multiple subsequent central appearances, including Giant-Size X-Men #1 (1975), where Cerebro senses and locates a supermutant across the globe, resulting in the recreation of the X-Men team.

Use and function of the device
Cerebro amplifies the brainwaves of the user. In the case of telepaths, it enables the user to detect traces of others worldwide, also able to distinguish between humans and mutants. Depictions of its inherent strength have been inconsistent; at times in the storylines it could detect mutated aliens outside of the planet, when at others it could only scan for mutants' signatures in the United States. It is not clear whether it finds mutants by the power signature they send out when they use their powers or by the presence of the X-gene in their body; both methods have been used throughout the comics.

Using Cerebro can be extremely dangerous, and telepaths without well-trained, disciplined minds put themselves at great risk when attempting to use it. This is due to the psychic feedback that users experience when operating Cerebro. As the device greatly enhances natural psychic ability, users who are unprepared for the sheer enormity of this increased psychic input can be quickly and easily overwhelmed, resulting in insanity, coma, permanent brain damage or even death. The one exception has been Magneto, who has been said to have minor or latent telepathic abilities as well as experience amplifying his mental powers with mechanical devices of his own design. Kitty Pryde once upgraded Cerebro so that non-telepaths could use the device. This was during the time that Professor Xavier was with the Shi'ar and Rachel Summers had just left the team. Kitty was able to track Nightcrawler who went missing after a battle with Nimrod.

The only characters to use Cerebro on a frequent basis are Professor X, Jean Grey, Emma Frost and the Stepford Cuckoos. However, Rachel Summers, Danielle Moonstar, Psylocke and Ruth Aldine have also used it. After the device was upgraded to Cerebra, Cassandra Nova used it in order to exchange minds with Xavier. The Stepford Cuckoos once utilized the machine to amplify their combined ability, with only one of them directly connected to the machine, but all of them experiencing its interaction due to their psychic rapport. The strain of mentally halting a riot during Open Day killed Sophie, the Stepford Cuckoo who was hooked up to Cerebra. Sophie was both inexperienced at using Cerebra and was high on the mutant-enhancing drug "Kick"; however, it was revealed that it was not the strain of using the machine, nor the drug, that was responsible for her death, but Sophie's own sister Esme, who also used Kick to power her own abilities, seize control of the Cuckoos temporarily, and manipulate Sophie into her death. The now remaining three Cuckoos demonstrated that they were capable of using Cerebra with relative ease in Phoenix: Endsong.

Some mutants have learned to shield themselves from Cerebro, usually via their own telepathic ability. Magneto can shield himself from the device through use of minimal telepathic powers; in the film series, he does so with a specially constructed helmet.

It would soon become apparent as to just what and how Cerebro was really meant to be used; on top of tracking and locating mutants across the globe the tracking device's primary function was to act as a soul jar that could catalog the thought pattern self of any and every mutant ever pinpointed through it. X essentially utilized this function to resurrect the mutant strike team lost while battling the Orchis Group by withholding their hard copied mind's, their anima, onto home grown clone bodies; which would effectively allow him to resurrect any and every mutant who has ever died or will die by imprinting a shell with their respective neuropsychic imprint.

History of the device
Originally, Cerebro was a device similar to a computer that was built into a desk in Xavier's office. This early version of Cerebro operated on punched cards, and did not require a user (telepathic or otherwise) to interface with it. A prototype version of Cerebro named Cyberno was used by Xavier to track down Cyclops in the "Origins of the X-Men" back-up story in X-Men #40. In the first published appearance of Cerebro, X-Men #7, Professor X left the X-Men on a secret mission (to find Lucifer) and left Cerebro to the new team leader, Cyclops, who used it to keep track of known evil mutants and to find new evil mutants. The device also warned the X-Men of the impending threat posed by the non-mutant Juggernaut prior to that character's first appearance. Later, the device was upgraded to the larger and more familiar telepathy-based technology with its interface helmet.

When the human-Sentinel gestalt Bastion stole Cerebro from the X-Mansion, Cerebro was hybridized with Bastion's programming via nanotechnology. The resulting entity, a self-aware form of Cerebro, created two minions, Cerebrites Alpha and Beta, through which it would act without exposing itself. It also used its Danger Room-derived records of the powers of the X-Men and the Brotherhood of Evil Mutants to create its own team of imposter "X-Men" whose members possessed the combined powers of specific members of each of the two teams. Cerebro's goal was to put human beings in stasis so that mutants could inherit the Earth, and to this end it hunted down a group of synthetic children called the Mannites who possessed vast psychic powers. It was destroyed by the X-Men, with the help of Professor X and the Mannite named Nina.

More recently, following the example set by the X-Men films, Cerebro has been replaced by Cerebra (referred to as Cerebro's big sister), a machine the size of a small room in the basement of Xavier's School For Higher Learning. Though designed to resemble the movie version of Cerebro, Cerebra is much smaller than the films' version. It resembles a pod filled with a sparkling fog that condenses into representations of mental images.

After it is discovered that Terrigen is toxic to mutants and Storm's X-Men move to Limbo, Forge programs Cerebra into the body of a Sentinel and uploads her with the capability to showcase human emotion. Cerebra accompanies the X-Men on many of their missions to help find mutants and bring them to X-Haven where they'll be safe from the Terrigen. Along with being able to detect mutants Cerebra can also fly and teleport, serving as a bridge between Earth and Limbo.

When the X-Men and Inhumans went to war to decide the fate of the remaining Terrigen cloud, Cerebra was destroyed after getting caught in the crossfire when Emma Frost unleashed an army of Sentinels programmed to kill Inhumans instead of mutants. While Storm's team of X-Men began returning refugees to their homes from X-Haven after Medusa destroyed the Terrigen cloud, Cerebra was found severely damaged in an abandoned barn surrounded by wild Sentinels. Once she was discovered and the X-Men saw that her current sentinel body was far beyond repair they uploaded her into a new body.

Later when a mutant nation was created on the Living Island Krakoa, Xavier reveals that when he approached Forge and asked him to expand the abilities of Cerebro, Forge was able to create a version of Cerebro that not only was capable of merely detecting mutant minds but also creating a copy of each mutants' mind. Forge was able to create this seventh version of the Cerebro as a portable unit able to be worn as a helmet by Xavier to focus his psionic talent at all times. Xavier first donned this Cerebro when he announced the existence of Krakoa to the world and invited all mutants to Krakoa. He then utilized its true functioning of stirring and transplanting persona & psyche while in conjunction with the technomorphically modified genus loci of Krakoa and the unified teamwork of the Five; a mutant conclave consisting of Joshua Foley, Hope Summers, Eva Bell, Kevin MacTaggert and Fabio Medina who gestate and accelerate the regrowth of fallen mutants by combining their powers.
Xavier also had five working Cerebro Cradles: one main unit, three backup units, and one additional backup unit for unforeseen complications. These Cerebro Cradles are strategically located at multiple locations.

Not soon after, XENO mercenaries were able to infiltrate Krakoa's defenses and successfully assassinate Professor X, destroying Cerebro in the process. Before Professor X was resurrected, Magneto reshaped the broken shards of Cerebro into the Cerebro Sword to represent Xavier's dream, once broken, but now forged anew and refined. The sword retained the information stored in the other Cerebro Cradles, however, it is encrypted.

Later one of the backup Cerebro unit become sentient and rebranded itself under the name Cerebrax. Hunger for intelligence and power, the sentient machine begins killing mutants across the island and eventualky takes control of Krakoa and begins unleashing a full-on attack. Answering the call to fight are Kid Omega, Omega Red, Wolverine, Domino and Phoebe Cuckoo. Kid Omega flies into Cerebrax and, with some help from Sage, unleashes a powerful explosion that ultimately destroys the Cerebro unit and himself. Given that Krakoa has the power to resurrect dead mutants, Wolverine tells Sage that they're going to have to do so for Kid Omega, however Sage reveals a problem, there's no trace of Kid Omega anywhere. He's wiped from all the Cerebro cradles.

Other versions
In Chris Claremont's X-Men: The End storyline, which takes place some 20 years ahead of standard X-Men continuity, Cerebro has been replaced in turn by the disembodied brain of Martha Johansson, a human psychic who was introduced during Grant Morrison's run on the X-Men.

In the video game X-Men Legends, Cerebro is identical to its appearance and usage in the X-Men film. Jean Grey and Emma Frost use the device at one point to attempt to return Professor X's mind to his body. In X-Men Legends II: Rise of Apocalypse, it was destroyed along with the rest of the mansion, but Forge mentioned plans on building Cerebra to replace it. He described Cerebra as Cerebro's big sister.

In the video game Marvel: Ultimate Alliance, while the team is staying in the Sanctum Sanctorum, Professor X used a device created by Beast allowing him to use Cerebro from long distance in order to find Nightcrawler, who had been kidnapped by Dr. Doom.

In the universe of Marvel Zombies, zombified versions of Beast and Mr. Fantastic reprogram Cerebro to help them and the other zombies track down the last remaining humans on Earth. Cerebro locates many in the European nation of Latveria, but all escape. In Marvel Zombies Return, the surviving zombies escape to another world where many of them restart the original infection, this time permanently fusing Professor X's partly zombiefied body with Cerebro so that he can find humans for them.

In the MC2 universe, the X-People carry "mini-cerebros", that can detect mutants just as well as the full-size version.

In other media

Films

Generation X
In the 1996 Generation X telefilm on Fox, Cerebro was depicted as a desktop personal computer with a few custom peripherals.

X-Men

Professor Jeffrey J. Kripal, in his 2011 book Mutants and Mystics: Science Fiction, Superhero Comics, and the Paranormal, describes the Cerebro of the X-Men films as "a futuristic superroom into which Professor Xavier wheels over a bridge in order to don the helmet that would magnify his already extraordinary telepathic powers and project the results onto the skull-like internal walls of the room." In the films X-Men and X2: X-Men United, Cerebro is a device that fills a massive spherical room in the basement of Xavier's School. The helmet interface is similar to the version seen in the comics, although the bulk of Cerebro's machinery is contained in the surrounding walls. While in use, three-dimensional images of the humans whose minds are being scanned by the device appear around the interface bridge. Unlike the comics' version of Cerebro, the film version can detect both human and mutant minds with ease. The unique signature of mutant brainwaves is shown in the first film by the mental images of humans depicted in black and white, while those of mutants show up in red. When Xavier illustrates his connection with every human and mutant mind on Earth in the sequel, X2, mutants appear in red, and humans in white.

In the first film, Professor X mentions to Wolverine that Magneto helped him build it, and therefore knows how to construct helmets with circuitry to block its detection abilities. Cerebro is sabotaged by Mystique so that it injures Professor X, putting him into a coma. The only person seen using Cerebro effectively in the films is Xavier; Jean Grey successfully used the device to locate Magneto in the original film, but the input overwhelmed her nascent telepathic power and left her stunned. This has not been mentioned in the comics, although the Magneto of the comics can use Cerebro, and has designed similar devices.

X2: X-Men United
In X2: X-Men United, the device was copied and modified by William Stryker in his plot to have a brainwashed Xavier use his Cerebro-amplified powers to kill the world's mutants, although this plan was later 'hi-jacked' by Magneto—immune to the telepathic assault via his helmet—so that Xavier would be used to kill humans. According to X2, it is difficult to pinpoint the location of mutants who have the ability to teleport and are constantly in transit, such as Nightcrawler.

In both films, Magneto's helmet is capable of blocking the telepathic signals from Cerebro, as well as any telepathic mutants.

X-Men: First Class
In X-Men: First Class, an early version of Cerebro exists in an unnamed CIA science facility, built by the young Hank McCoy to amplify brainwaves. In a slight departure from the source material, its creation and design is attributed to Hank, instead of Charles Xavier. It is used by Xavier to find and recruit mutants for training in order to oppose Sebastian Shaw. It is later destroyed by Riptide as Shaw searches the facility for the young mutants.

In the film, Emma Frost comments on her perception of Xavier's increased telepathic range when using Cerebro, which she feels despite being some thousands of miles away.

X-Men: Days of Future Past
In X-Men: Days of Future Past, Cerebro appears in the future X-Jet as a built in extension to Xavier's hover-chair and is made up of three sensor-pads and a 3D holographic projector. In the past, it appears as it did in X-Men and X2, albeit dusty from long years of neglect due to the past Xavier's current inability to use his powers. As his abilities begin to return, the young Xavier initially attempts to use it to find Mystique after she escapes from their first confrontation, but has trouble concentrating enough to use it properly due to his current emotional turmoil. However, a conversation with his future self—using the time-displaced Wolverine as a 'bridge' to make contact with his other self in the future, who is close to Wolverine's currently-comatose body—helps him regain his old focus, allowing him to temporarily control others to speak to Raven before sending a psychic projection directly to her.

In the Rogue Cut version of the film, Cerebro is being used in the future as a prison for Rogue, who is being experimented on by the Sentinels' human agents in the hope of finding a way to duplicate her ability to take powers from others, with Cerebro being used as the room's interior is shielded from external telepathic probes. Also, in 1973, Mystique returns to the mansion to get treatment for her wound as a cover for her real agenda to smash Cerebro, preventing Xavier from finding her again.

X-Men: Apocalypse
Cerebro appears in X-Men: Apocalypse where Xavier uses Cerebro and sees Moira searching for Erik. Xavier tells Alex to destroy Cerebro after Apocalypse is able to use Xavier's search for him to take control of Xavier's powers through Cerebro, although Apocalypse still manages to use Xavier to make humanity sacrifice most of its nuclear weapons before Cerebro is lost.

Logan
In this alternate timeline, Cerebro has become a covering at Logan and Charles Xavier's home at an abandoned smelting mill in Mexico.

Deadpool 2
Cerebro appears when Deadpool is trying to use the Cerebro at the X-Mansion to “look into the future.”

Dark Phoenix
Cerebro appears in Dark Phoenix When Xavier uses it to navigate Jean's mind and later to locate Jean, Magneto and Hank.

Television

X-Men: The Animated Series
In the X-Men: The Animated Series Cerebro was heavily featured throughout the series' duration. It was primarily used by Professor Xavier and he was shown to use it in various ways, such as detecting mutants, increasing his powers, and even understanding Shi'ar technology, and so forth. There was no specified room where Cerebro was kept as in the other animated series but instead came out from the ceiling in most notably the War Room where the X-Men held their team meetings. Jean Grey was also noted to use Cerebro frequently and it would amplify her telepathic powers as it did for Professor X. Jean Grey in this animated series did not always join the X-Men on their field missions but rather monitored them telepathically using Cerebro's help. Even the White Queen of the Hellfire Club, Emma Frost, used Cerebro when she telepathically hacked into it to secretly "spy" on Xavier, the X-Men, and to learn more about Jean Grey and her transformation into the Phoenix. The X-Men's Blackbird jet was also equipped with its own Cerebro.

X-Men: Evolution
In the animated series X-Men: Evolution, Cerebro was featured numerous times. It was shown being used mainly by the Professor and eventually Jean Grey. In the beginning of the series Cerebro was a primitive version of what it would later become as the show progressed eventually taking an appearance identical to the Cerebro in the X-Men films. Cerebro originally appeared as a computer console with custom peripherals that came out of a hidden wall component in the mansion. Eventually, this Cerebro was destroyed by Professor X's evil step-brother the Juggernaut. When it was rebuilt the Cerebro was given its own room, instead of the hidden wall component as before, and looked identical to the designs of Cerebro in the films. Cerebro even came in a portable helmet form for travel and field missions. Jean Grey used this Cerebro to amplify her telepathic powers as she did in the comics and previous series. It even helped boost Jean's telepathic powers in order to battle a possessed Professor X in the series finale. During the fight, Cerebro was shown to unleash the Phoenix within Jean for a split second, eventually gaining the power to defeat the evil Xavier, and return him to normal. In the episode "Fun and Games", Arcade, a student version of one of the X-Men greatest villains, hacked into Cerebro and used it to control the mansion's security system to attack the X-Men believing the program to be a game. However, he made no use of its telepathy-enhancement technology, instead merely rewiring it to allow him access to the security systems.

Wolverine and the X-Men
In the 2008 series, Wolverine and the X-Men, Cerebro is extremely important to the overall series as it serves as a link to the past, present, and future. Originally Cerebro was damaged in an unexplained attack on Professor X in the present where he ends up in a coma only to awake twenty years into the future. In the future twenty years from now the X-Men have all been killed and the world is being controlled by the mutant-hunting robots named Sentinels. Xavier, with the surviving Cerebro components he finds, telepathically contacts the X-Men twenty years in the past (the present) and instructs them to stop those who would create the bleak future he awakes in twenty years later (his present). During the majority of the X-Men's present, as well as its first appearances in the future, it is similar to the version seen in the X-Men films, however, for the majority of the scenes in the future, Xavier uses a Portable version of Cerebro. With Warren Worthington's money and Forge's technical expertise, the X-Men were able to get the destroyed Cerebro at the mansion repaired. As Xavier is comatose in the present and Jean Grey missing, Emma Frost serves as the team's resident telepath and she primarily uses Cerebro.

Black Panther
In the 2010 series Black Panther, Storm uses Cerebro to locate Juggernaut in Wakanda.

Legion
An early version of Cerebro is used by Professor X in the third-season episode "Chapter 22."

M.O.D.O.K.
 The Cerebro helmet appears in the second episode of M.O.D.O.K., where it was found by M.O.D.O.K. in a S.H.I.E.L.D. storage facility.

References

1964 in comics
X-Men
Fictional elements introduced in 1964